Derek Khan (August 21, 1957 – February 15, 2021) was a Trinidadian-American fashion stylist. He was known for his styling of hip-hop artists in the 1990s and 2000s.

References 

1957 births
2021 deaths
Fashion stylists
Trinidad and Tobago emigrants to the United States
People from Arima
Deaths from the COVID-19 pandemic in the United Arab Emirates